Risedronic acid, often used as its sodium salt risedronate sodium, is a bisphosphonate. It slows down the cells which break down bone. It's used to treat or prevent osteoporosis, and treat Paget's disease of bone. It is taken by mouth.

It was patented in 1984 and approved for medical use in 1998.

Pharmacology

Society and culture

Brand names
It is produced and marketed by Warner Chilcott, Sanofi-Aventis, and in Japan by Takeda under the trade names Actonel, Atelvia, and Benet. It is also available in a preparation that includes a calcium carbonate supplement, as Actonel with Calcium.

Controversies
In January 2006 P&G and its marketing partner Sanofi-Aventis filed a Lanham Act false claims lawsuit against rival drugmakers Roche and GlaxoSmithKline claiming false advertising about Boniva. The manufacturers of Boniva, a rival bisphosphonate, were accused in the suit of causing a "serious public health risk" through misrepresentation of scientific findings. In a ruling on September 7, 2006, U.S. District Judge Paul A. Crotty rejected P&G's attempted injunction. P&G was criticized for attempting to "preserve its market share by denigrating Boniva". Judge Crotty wrote that "Roche was clearly entitled to respond with its own data, provided that the data was truthfully and accurately presented".

In 2006, P&G faced controversy over its handling of clinical research involving risedronate (News Reports and discussion).

In common with other bisphosphonate drugs, risedronate appears to be associated with the rare side effect osteonecrosis of the jaw, often preceded by dental procedures inducing trauma to the bone.

References

External links 
 
 

Bisphosphonates
Farnesyl pyrophosphate synthase inhibitors
Procter & Gamble
3-Pyridyl compounds
AbbVie brands
Sanofi
Takeda Pharmaceutical Company brands